The Diamond Head Classic is a three-day invitational college basketball tournament held at the Stan Sheriff Center in Honolulu, Hawaii on the campus of the University of Hawaii-Manoa. Each team plays three games, winners facing winners and losers facing losers.  The Big West Conference serves as the host. The tournament is ESPN-owned and operated.

The inaugural tournament was won by USC. The most recent champions are the Hawai'i Rainbow Warriors.

Yearly champions, runners-up, and MVPs

References

External links
 Diamond Head Classic

 
College men's basketball competitions in the United States
College basketball competitions
Recurring sporting events established in 2009
2009 establishments in Hawaii